The 1959 Tourist Trophy may refer to the following races:
 The 1959 Isle of Man TT, for Grand Prix Motorcycles
 The 1959 RAC Tourist Trophy, for sports cars held at Goodwood
 The 1959 Australian Tourist Trophy, for sports cars held at Lowood
 The 1959 Dutch TT, for Grand Prix Motorcycles held at Assen